
The following lists events that happened during 1821 in South Africa.

Events
 The London Missionary Society mission station at Kuruman, Northern Cape is started by Robert Moffat

References
See Years in South Africa for list of References

 
South Africa
Years in South Africa